VSK Kaumudi is the current Special Secretary (Internal security), Ministry of Home Affairs (India) Government of India and Secretary (Security) in Cabinet Secretariat Government of India. 

Kaumudi was director general , Board of Police Research & Development   Additional Director General of National Investigation Agency,

References 

Year of birth missing (living people)
Andhra Pradesh Police
Ministry of Home Affairs (India)